HMS Ramillies was a 74-gun third rate ship of the line of the Royal Navy, launched on 15 April 1763 at Chatham Dockyard.

Career 
Ramillies took part in the action of 9 August 1780, when a convoy she was escorting fell prey to a Spanish squadron. 55 merchantmen were captured, but she managed to escape.

In 1782 she was the flagship of a fleet under Admiral Thomas Graves off Newfoundland. Ramillies was badly damaged in a violent storm of 1782, and was finally abandoned and burned on 21 September 1782.

On 16–19 September, she was escorting a convoy from Jamaica when they were hit by the storm. Frantic efforts were made to save her. All anchors, cannon, and masts were shipped over the side. The hull was bound together with rope, officers and men manned the pumps for 24 hours a day for 3 days. However despite all the water continued to rise. The exhausted crew were rescued by nearby merchantmen, and the last man, Captain Sylverius Moriarty, set her on fire as he left.

Robert Dodd painted a series of four documenting the tragedy. "The demise of the Ramillies" comprises: "A Storm coming on", "The Storm increas'd", "The Ramillies Water Logg'd with her Admiral & Crew quitting the Wreck", and "The Ramillies Destroyed". In 1795 a set of four coloured mezzotints were engraved and published by Jukes from his shop at No.10 Howland Street.

Notes

References

External links

Ships of the line of the Royal Navy
Ramillies-class ships of the line
Shipwrecks in the Atlantic Ocean
1763 ships
Maritime incidents in 1782
Ship fires
Ships built in Chatham